John "Johnny Boy" D'Amato (died January 1992) was a New Jersey mobster and former acting boss of the DeCavalcante crime family. After being recruited by Gambino crime family boss John Gotti to take over the family, he was suspected of engaging in homosexual activity and was murdered in January 1992.

Captain 
After being promoted caporegime during the 1980s by Giovanni "John the Eagle" Riggi, D'Amato became heavily involved in large labor and construction racketeering operations with prominent New Jersey mobsters Giacomo "Jake" Amari and Girolamo "Jimmy" Palermo. D'Amato, of the powerful Elizabeth faction of the DeCavalcante crime family, was soon cooperating with high-ranking members Charles "Big Ears" Majuri and Gaetano "Corky" Vastola in illegal gambling and loansharking operations.

Recruited by John Gotti 
After longtime boss Giovanni Riggi went on to be indicted for labor racketeering and extortion charges in late 1989, Vastola stepped up as the new acting boss of the North Jersey Mafia while Riggi was on trial. It was around this time, rival Gambino crime family boss John Gotti reached out to several members of the family, in an attempt to gain full control of it. One of these mobsters was D'Amato, who reportedly conspired with Gotti and his underboss Salvatore "Sammy the Bull" Gravano into murdering Vastola. (Gotti was later convicted of this conspiracy.) Soon, Riggi was convicted of his charges and sentenced to 15 years in 1990, which meant that Vastola kept running the day-to-day activities. Only after Riggi's conviction, Vastola was convicted in major extortion charges and sentenced to eight years in prison. From behind bars, Riggi promoted D'Amato as acting boss of the DeCavalcante crime family.

Murder 
In January 1992, Anthony Capo participated in the murder of D'Amato. Earlier in 1991, D'Amato's girlfriend, retaliating against D'Amato over an argument, told Anthony Rotondo that D'Amato was an active bisexual. She described swinging encounters that D'Amato had in Manhattan sex clubs with both women and men. Rotondo shared this information with underboss Giacomo Amari, and consigliere Stefano Vitabile. As Capo described it in court testimony in 2003,"Nobody's going to respect us if we have a gay homosexual boss sitting down discussing La Cosa Nostra business." In addition, many family members believed that D'Amato was controlled by Gambino boss John Gotti. The three men ordered D'Amato's execution and gave the job to Capo, Vincent Palermo and James Gallo. In contravention of Cosa Nostra rules on the killing of a family boss, the plotters did not ask permission from the Mafia Commission in New York.

On the day of the attack, Capo and another man picked up D'Amato a block from his girlfriend's house in Brooklyn to drive to lunch. With D'Amato sitting in the back seat, Capo turned and shot D'Amato four times, killing him. Capo and Rotundo left the body at a safe house, where other mobsters disposed of it. D'Amato's body was never recovered. Informed in prison of D'Amato's execution, Riggi appointed Amari as the new acting boss.

Aftermath 
In 2003, capos Philip "Phil" Abramo, Giuseppe "Pino" Schifilliti and the reputed consigliere Stefano Vitabile were charged in organizing various crimes, including the murder of D'Amato. Reputed men involved in the murder conspiracy, Palermo, Capo and Rotondo would later testify about this murder against their former associates. In 2006, Abramo, Schifilliti and Vitabile were sentenced to life imprisonment.

See also
List of kidnappings
List of solved missing person cases

References

1990s missing person cases
1992 deaths
American victims of anti-LGBT hate crimes
Bisexual men
DeCavalcante crime family
Kidnapped American people
LGBT people from New Jersey
Missing person cases in New Jersey
Murder convictions without a body
Murdered American gangsters of Italian descent
People murdered by the DeCavalcante crime family
People murdered in New Jersey
Violence against men in North America
Year of birth missing